The 2018 City of Lincoln Council election took place on 3 May 2018 to elect members of City of Lincoln Council in England. This was held on the same day as other local elections. One third 33 seats were up for election, with one councillors in each of the 11 wards being elected. As the previous election in 2016 had  been an all-out election with new ward boundaries, the seats of the candidates that had finished third in each ward in 2016 were up for election.

Overall results

|}

Ward results

Abbey

Birchwood

Boultham

Carholme

Castle

Glebe

Hartsholme

Minster

Moorland

Park

Witham

References

2018 English local elections
2018
2010s in Lincolnshire